The Regina Rams represent the University of Regina, located in Regina, Saskatchewan in the sport of Canadian football in U Sports. The Rams joined U Sports in 1999 and have competed in the Canada West Conference since then. The program has won one U Sports football conference championship, in 2000, and the team has made one appearance in the Vanier Cup championship game.

The Rams nickname is used by the university's football team only; all of the other teams at the school are named the Regina Cougars.

Club history
The Regina Rams were formed in 1954 when two junior football teams, the Bombers and the Dales, merged into one football club. The Rams participated in the Man-Sask Junior Football League until 1976, when they joined with junior teams from Alberta to form the Prairie Football Conference. The club would participate in the CJFL until 1998, winning ten Canadian Junior Football Championships along the way.

In 1999, after competing for 45 years in junior football (Canadian Junior Football League), the Regina Rams became a member of the Canada West Conference of the Canadian Intercollegiate Athletic Union (CIAU), later Canadian Interuniversity Sport (CIS) and now U Sports. The University of Regina came to community partnership agreement with the CJFL team that made the transfer possible. Rather than change their name to Regina Cougars, the football team continued to use the moniker "Rams." In only their second year of playing in the CIAU, the Rams won the Canada West Conference championship and then the Atlantic Bowl. They then went on their way to the Vanier Cup where they lost 42–39 to Marcel Bellefeuille's Ottawa Gee-Gees in the 36th Vanier Cup.
 
Frank McCrystal was the head coach of the Rams from their inception in the CIS until 2014. He first took the reins of the team in 1984, making 2014 his 31st season as head coach of the Rams and his 16th in the CIS. In 2007, after leading his team to a 6–2 regular season record and an appearance in the Hardy Cup game, McCrystal was named Canadian Interuniversity Sport Coach of the Year and received the 2007 Frank Tindall Trophy.

The Rams played the inaugural sporting event at Mosaic Stadium on October 1, 2016, hosting the University of Saskatchewan Huskies. At the end of the 2016 season, quarterback Noah Picton became the first Rams player to win the Hec Crighton Trophy after completing 224 passes out of 323 attempts for 3,186 yards with 25 touchdowns and nine interceptions. That was also the first season that the Rams finished in first place in the Canada West regular season.

CIAU/CIS/U Sports Regular Season Results

(*)The Rams forfeited three wins in 2018 due to use of an ineligible player. Those games were then awarded as 1-0 wins to Alberta, UBC, and Manitoba.

Regina Rams in the professional ranks

As of the end of the 2022 CFL season, six former Rams players were on CFL teams' rosters:
Theren Churchill, Toronto Argonauts
Jorgen Hus, Saskatchewan Roughriders
Brendon LaBatte, Saskatchewan Roughriders
Mitchell Picton, Saskatchewan Roughriders
Jon Ryan, Edmonton Elks
Richard Sindani, Calgary Stampeders

As of the start of the 2022 NFL season, two former Rams players were on NFL teams' rosters:
Tevaughn Campbell, Los Angeles Chargers
Akiem Hicks, Tampa Bay Buccaneers

References

 
U Sports teams
U Sports football teams
University of Regina
Former Canadian Junior Football League teams